Alfredo Omar Ábalos (born 17 March 1986) is an Argentine footballer who currently plays for Rangers de Talca.

Career statistics

References

External links
 
 
 

1986 births
Living people
Argentine expatriate footballers
Argentine footballers
Club y Biblioteca Ramón Santamarina footballers
Club Atlético Acassuso footballers
Club Atlético Platense footballers
Nueva Chicago footballers
Curicó Unido footballers
Primera B de Chile players
Expatriate footballers in Chile
Association football forwards
Sportspeople from Buenos Aires Province